Sir Paul Robert Stephenson  (born 26 September 1953) is a British retired police officer who was the Metropolitan Police Commissioner from 2009 to 2011.

Stephenson joined the Lancashire police in 1975 and attended the Bramshill staff training course. As a superintendent, he was closely involved in the inquiry into the 1989 Hillsborough stadium disaster. After serving as chief constable of Lancashire, he was promoted deputy commissioner of the Metropolitan Police in 2005, acting commissioner in 2008, and finally commissioner in January 2009. In July 2011, Stephenson resigned over speculation regarding his connection with Neil Wallis, suspected of involvement in the News International phone hacking scandal.

Biography
Stephenson grew up in Bacup in the Rossendale district of east Lancashire, the son of a butcher. He attended Fearns County Secondary School in Stacksteads where he excelled at swimming and went on to Bacup and Rawtenstall Grammar School to do his 'A' levels  and became head boy.

Stephenson originally desired a career in the footwear industry, and took up work at the Bacup Shoe Company factory in nearby Stacksteads. By the age of 20 he was made a trainee manager, but in 1975 he followed his elder brother into the police force.

Personal life
Stephenson lives in Lancashire with his wife, Lynda, and their three children.

Career
Stephenson joined the police service in 1975, aged 21 and spent much of his early service as a constable attached to the Lancashire Underwater Search Unit. In 1982 Stephenson attended the Bramshill police training college near Hook in Hampshire as a sergeant on the Special Course at the same time as Sir Hugh Orde, Peter Clarke, Tim Brain, Paul Kernaghan, Frank Whitely, Jane Stitchbury and numerous other chief police officers. He became a sergeant in Bacup (1983), then an inspector in Burnley (1984) and a Chief Inspector in Colne Traffic Department (1986). He became a superintendent at the age of 34 in February 1988 when in Accrington as sub-divisional commander before being appointed to a Headquarters research and planning post where he also acted as staff officer to his then Chief Constable, Brian Johnson CBE, QPM, who was professional advisor to Sir Peter Taylor during the course of him undertaking the Hillsborough Inquiry (1989–1990). Stephenson was thus party to all of the material submitted to and considered by the Taylor Inquiry, albeit in a relatively junior position. He took a six-month secondment to the (former) RUC in the early 1990s as a sub-divisional commander, a posting that ended in some acrimony. He returned to Lancashire to a further Headquarters support post before being appointed in 1994 as a sub-divisional commander then divisional commander in Preston. He has also served as Assistant Chief Constable in Merseyside Police starting in 1994 until 1999 and Deputy Chief Constable in Lancashire from May 1999 under Chief Constable Pauline Clare. Stephenson succeeded Pauline Clare and was appointed as Chief Constable of Lancashire Constabulary in July 2002. He was appointed deputy commissioner of the Metropolitan Police in February 2005.

In September 2008 it was announced he would become acting commissioner of the Met from 1 December, following the resignation of Sir Ian Blair. In January 2009 it was announced that he had been appointed as commissioner of the Metropolitan Police Service.

Resignation
In July 2011, Stephenson's judgement was questioned after it emerged that Neil Wallis, a former executive editor of the News of the World had acted as a media consultant to the MPS in 2009 and 2010, and also that in early 2011 Stephenson received £12,000 of free hospitality from a Champneys health spa, where Wallis was working at the time whilst Stephenson was recovering from surgery for the removal of a non-malignant tumour in his femur. On 14 July 2011, Wallis was arrested by the Metropolitan Police investigating the News of the World phone hacking scandal.

On 17 July, in a lengthy statement in which he defended his actions, Stephenson announced his intention to resign as commissioner, saying that questions surrounding his integrity would otherwise become detrimental to the Met as a whole. The Deputy Commissioner, Tim Godwin, became Acting Commissioner in the interim between Sir Paul's resignation and the appointment of his successor, Bernard Hogan-Howe.

This is an excerpt from Stephenson's statement:

Honours
Stephenson was awarded the Queen's Police Medal for services to policing in the 2000 New Year Honours, followed in 2007 by an Honorary Fellowship from the University of Central Lancashire in Preston. He was knighted in the Queen's 2008 Birthday Honours.

See also
 News International phone hacking scandal
 Phone hacking scandal reference lists
 Metropolitan police role in phone hacking scandal

References

External links
 Times October 2008
 Preston Citizen October 2008
 Evening Standard October 2008

|-

|-

1953 births
British Chief Constables
Commissioners of Police of the Metropolis
Knights Bachelor
Living people
Deputy Commissioners of Police of the Metropolis
People associated with the News International phone hacking scandal
People from Bacup
English recipients of the Queen's Police Medal
Royal Ulster Constabulary officers
People educated at Bacup and Rawtenstall Grammar School
People associated with the University of Central Lancashire